The 1989 World Rally Championship was the 17th season of the Fédération Internationale de l'Automobile (FIA) World Rally Championship (WRC).  The season consisted of 13 rallies, with some adjustments to the schedule versus the previous season.  The WRC ended its participation in North America by removing the Olympus Rally from the schedule, implementing in its place Rally Australia.  An anomaly in the schedule was that 1989 was the only year in which the Swedish Rally and the Rallye de Monte Carlo were switched in place, with the Swedish event taking place to start the year.  This made it the second and last time that Monte Carlo would not mark the first event of the WRC season until the 2009 season.

Martini Lancia continued their domination of the sport for a third year in 1989, winning the first six rallies in which manufacturer points were awarded, and ultimately winning the title with plenty of room to spare.  Italian Miki Biasion, Finn Markku Alén and Frenchman Bruno Saby returned to the team, while other successful drivers employed by the team through the year included French native Didier Auriol, Swede Mikael Ericsson, and Argentine driver Jorge Recalde.  The team drove the Lancia Delta Integrale through the year.  The car also remained the one of choice for the Jolly Club team's main drivers, Italians Alex Fiorio and Dario Cerrato.  Complementing the manufacturer's success in the standings, Lancia drivers placed well throughout the top ranks in the drivers championship as well.  Biasion seized the championship handily, becoming the WRC's second repeat champion, while Fiorio settled for a distant second, a position fought for through the year against Toyota's driver, Kankkunen.  Other successful Lancia pilots included Mikael Ericsson in fourth and Auriol behind him in fifth place.

Toyota Team Europe represented the only serious challenge to Martini and the Lancias with it Toyota Celica GT-Four and a stable of drivers that included former world champion Finn Juha Kankkunen and the only Group A winner, Swede Kenneth Eriksson, as well as a rising star from Spain, Carlos Sainz.  All three had successes during the year, though the team was never able to overcome Lancia's early domination of the manufacturer title race.  Kankkunen challenged for second overall, but ultimately had to settle for third place, while Kenneth Eriksson took sixth and Sainz finished in eighth.

After an initial win in Sweden by its main driver, Swede Ingvar Carlsson, Mazda Rally Team Europe was unable to repeat their success, yet still captured third overall amongst manufacturers while Carlsson took seventh in the driver championship standings.  Mitsubishi's competitive team Ralliart made its entrance to the WRC scene, taking two rally wins with its Galant VR-4 car, one by Swede Mikael Ericsson in Finland and a second by Finn Pentti Airikkala in England.  Ericsson's victory in Finland followed his win in the previous round in Argentina driving a Lancia, giving him the distinction of being the first winner of consecutive WRC events for different manufacturers.  Mitsubishi was able to obtain fourth place overall in the standings.  The Audi Quattro continued to be competitive in the hands of privateers during the early part of the season, garnering the maker with enough points for fifth, while Simon Racing's Renault 5 GT Turbo powered their driver, Frenchman Alain Oreille to victory in the Ivory Coast and 10th place in the driver standings while securing sixth for the manufacturer.

For 1989, the number of rallies for which manufacturer points would be awarded was reduced to ten of the thirteen events, with events in Sweden, the Ivory Coast, and New Zealand only counting towards the driver titles.



Teams and Drivers

Events

Championship for manufacturers 

Schedule of points by place:

Championship for drivers 

Schedule of points by place:

Cup for production car drivers

See also 
 1989 in sports

External links

 FIA World Rally Championship 1989 at ewrc-results.com

World Rally Championship
World Rally Championship seasons